Anadia buenaventura is a species of lizard in the family Gymnophthalmidae. It is endemic to Ecuador.

References

Anadia (genus)
Reptiles of Ecuador
Endemic fauna of Ecuador
Reptiles described in 2018
Taxa named by Raquel Betancourt
Taxa named by Carolina Reyes-Puig
Taxa named by Simón E. Lobos
Taxa named by Mario H. Yánez- Muñoz
Taxa named by Omar Torres-Carvajal